The British American Football Association (BAFA) is the national governing body for the sport of American football and non-contact Flag Football in the United Kingdom since 1985. It is affiliated to the International Federation of American Football (IFAF). In 2010, they formed the BAFA National Leagues as the country's primary competition for contact football. Their flagship event is the annual Britbowl which is competed by the top two sides of the BAFANL Premier Division's.

Competitions

Adult

Youth

2021 BAFA National Youth Flag finals

Final standings

Member bodies

Current
 BAFCA (British American Football Coaches Association)
 BAFRA (British American Football Referees Association)
 BUAFL (British Universities American Football League)

Defunct
  BAFL (British American Football League) - split from BAFA in 2010, and ceased operations in the same year.
 BYAFA (British Youth American Football Association) - dissolved 2007 and merged into BAFL
 BSAFA (British Students American Football Association) - Disaffiliated 2007 leading to the foundation, by BAFA, of the BUAFL.
 SGA (Scottish Gridiron Association)

Boards of directors

References

External links
 BAFA
 EFAF
 IFAF

American football in the United Kingdom
American football governing bodies in Europe
Organisations based in Northumberland
Sport in Northumberland
Amer